Breagh MacKinnon (born January 17, 1991), known professionally as Breagh Isabel, is a Canadian recording artist, songwriter, and producer based in Halifax, Nova Scotia. She has written for a variety of Canadian artists, including Banners, Donovan Woods, Classified, Jocelyn Alice, and Ria Mae.

Life and career

Born into a musical family on Cape Breton Island, Isabel began writing songs in high school. In college, she majored in jazz piano performance, while writing and recording music of her own. In 2015, Isabel, still performing as Breagh MacKinnon, teamed up with fellow singer-songwriters Dylan Guthro and Carleton Stone to form the band Port Cities. In 2016, the band was signed to Turtlemusik and Warner Music.
Port Cities' debut album, produced by Gordie Sampson, was released on February 10, 2017. That same year, the band took home five Nova Scotia Music Awards, winning Entertainer of the Year, Digital Artist of the Year, Group Recording of the Year, Pop Recording of the Year, and Recording of the Year. 

Isabel parted ways with the band in 2019, following the release of their single "Sorry," which was co-produced by Grammy-winning Canadian songwriter and producer Greg Wells. 

Isabel made her production debut in 2020, co-producing the single "Missing Me" by Jocelyn Alice and Mathew V, released in 604 Records. In the spring of 2020, under the name Breagh Isabel, she featured as a recording artist and co-writer on the single "Good News," by the award-winning Canadian rapper and producer Classified. 

Isabel is an out member of the LGBTQ community. In June 2021, she released her debut solo single, "Girlfriends" and its accompanying music video. "Girlfriends" tells a story of two young girls' friendship-turned-romance.

In 2020, Isabel joined the roster of Concord Music Publishing in Nashville, which has to led to song placements in 2021 on Grey's Anatomy and Batwoman.

Selected discography

References

External links
 
  Breagh Isabel on Spotify

1991 births
Canadian pop singers
Canadian women singer-songwriters
Living people
Musicians from Halifax, Nova Scotia